Elachista anagna is a moth of the family Elachistidae. It is found in the United States in Arizona and Colorado.

The length of the forewings is 4–4.9 mm. The costa in the basal third of the forewing is dark gray. The ground color is grayish white with an ocherous tinge, especially in the distal half. The hindwings are dark brownish gray. The underside of the wings is dark brownish gray.

Etymology
The species name is an artificial combination of letters.

References

Moths described in 1997
anagna
Moths of North America